Coenonympha arcania, the pearly heath, is a butterfly species belonging to the family Nymphalidae. It can be found in Central Europe. It resembles Coenonympha hero. Seitz describes it thus C. arcania L. (48 d). Forewing fiery reddish yellow with black distal margin, hindwing dark brown. Easily recognised by the underside of the hindwing, whose marginal portion is occupied by a broad white band, which in the nymotypical form interrupts the row of ocelli below the apical eye, the latter therefore appearing to be placed on the inside of the white band. All Europe except great Britain, from Scandinavia to the Mediterranean sea and from Spain and France to the Black sea and Armenia. — Specimens
with a very broadly black margin to the forewing and a narrowed and slightly dentate band on the underside of the hindwing, which probably occur among nymotypical specimens everywhere, but especially in the South, are considered as ab. insubrica Frey (48 d). — Larva green with dark dorsal stripe bordered with a yellowish tint, light subdorsal stripe and pale yellow lateral stripe; head blue-green, mouth and anal fork red. Until May on grasses. Pupa brown, with whitish wing-cases edged with red. Butterflies very common in June and July and often flying together in large numbers. At the edge of woods full of undergrowth, but also in the open country and on hills. They affect flying round bushes and settle on the tip of low twigs, but sometimes also fly up into the higher branches of trees. The females are much less numerous than the males and appear later.

The butterflies fly in one generation from May to August.

The larvae feed on various grasses.

References

External links
 Vlindernet 
 Butterfly Conservation Armenia: Coenonympha arcania

Coenonympha
Butterflies of Asia
Butterflies of Europe
Fauna of Armenia
Butterflies described in 1761
Taxa named by Carl Linnaeus